In a computer or data transmission system, to abort means to terminate, usually in a controlled manner, a processing activity because it is impossible or undesirable for the activity to proceed or in conjunction with an error.  Such an action may be accompanied by diagnostic information on the aborted process.

In addition to being a verb, abort also has two noun senses.  In the most general case, the event of aborting can be referred to as an abort.  Sometimes the event of aborting can be given a special name, as in the case of an abort involving a Unix kernel where it is known as a kernel panic.  Specifically in the context of data transmission, an abort is a function invoked by a sending station to cause the recipient to discard or ignore all bit sequences transmitted by the sender since the preceding flag sequence.

In the C programming language, abort() is a standard library function that terminates the current application and returns an error code to the host environment.

See also
 Abort, Retry, Fail?
 Abnormal end
 Crash
 Hang
 Reset
 Reboot

References

Computing terminology